Alfred Eluère (28 July 1893 – 12 March 1985) was a French rugby union player who competed in the 1920 Summer Olympics. In 1920 he won the silver medal as member of the French team.

References

External links
profile

1893 births
1985 deaths
Sportspeople from Maine-et-Loire
French rugby union players
Olympic rugby union players of France
Rugby union players at the 1920 Summer Olympics
Olympic silver medalists for France
Medalists at the 1920 Summer Olympics
Presidents of the French Rugby Federation